Anna Julia Molin (born 13 May 1990) is a Swedish professional footballer who plays as a defender for the Scottish Women's Premier League (SWPL) club Glasgow City. In addition to Scotland and her native Sweden, she has played professionally in Cyprus, Italy and Norway.

Club career

Molin progressed through the youth system at Wä IF, then made her debut for Kristianstads DFF in the 2009 season. She spent time on loan at Vittsjö GIK in the Söderettan and signed a new two-year contract with Kristianstads in December 2009. In December 2012, after making 46 Damallsvenskan appearances for Kristianstads, Molin refused a new contract offer and transferred to AIK.

In 2016 Molin fulfilled her ambition of playing overseas, when she joined Apollon of the Cypriot Women's First Division. Two years later she moved on to the Italian Serie A with Verona. After a short spell in the Norwegian Toppserien with Avaldsnes, Molin signed for Glasgow City in December 2020.

References

External links

AIK profile 
SvFF profile 

1990 births
Living people
People from Kristianstad Municipality
Swedish women's footballers
Damallsvenskan players
Women's association football defenders
Sportspeople from Skåne County
Kristianstads DFF players
AIK Fotboll (women) players
Serie A (women's football) players
Swedish expatriate women's footballers
Swedish expatriate sportspeople in Italy
Expatriate women's footballers in Italy
Swedish expatriate sportspeople in Scotland
Expatriate women's footballers in Scotland
Swedish expatriate sportspeople in Norway
Expatriate women's footballers in Norway
Swedish expatriate sportspeople in Cyprus
Expatriate women's footballers in Cyprus
Apollon Ladies F.C. players
Vittsjö GIK players
Glasgow City F.C. players
Scottish Women's Premier League players
Toppserien players
Avaldsnes IL players
Hellas Verona Women players
A.S.D. AGSM Verona F.C. players
U.S. Sassuolo Calcio (women) players
Elitettan players
21st-century Swedish women